MasterChef Colombia is a Colombian competitive cooking reality show that broadcast by RCN Televisión since January 14, 2015. It is based on the original British television show MasterChef.

Judges

Season 1 (2015)

Contestants

Season 2 (2016)

Contestants

See also 
 MasterChef

References

External links 
  

Colombia
RCN Televisión original programming
2015 Colombian television series debuts
Non-British television series based on British television series